MGM Timber Bayview Stadium, known formerly as New Bayview, is a football stadium in the Scottish town of Methil, Fife. It is home to East Fife. It was opened in 1998, after the club relocated from the original Bayview Park across town.

The stadium can accommodate up to  spectators all of whom are seated in a single stand running along one side of the pitch.  There are open areas for future expansion.  In 2008 plans were announced to increase capacity with the erection of a covered terrace/stand at the sea end of the stadium.  Due to the economic climate in 2009 these plans were put on hold.

The stadium's capacity was temporarily expanded to 4,700 for a Scottish League One match against Rangers in October 2013.

The site of the stadium is near the mouth of the River Forth and the pitch used to be overshadowed by Methil power station, until it was demolished in April 2011.

From its inception, the stadium had a grass playing surface, however, in May 2017 a new 3G artificial pitch was installed for the start of the 2017–18 season.

The stadium was remained in March 2023 following a new partnership with MGM Timber.

See also
 Scottish stadium moves

References

External links
 Bayview Stadium at scottishgroundguide.co.uk

East Fife F.C.
Football venues in Scotland
Sports venues in Fife
Levenmouth
Scottish Football League venues
Scottish Professional Football League venues
Sports venues completed in 1998
1998 establishments in Scotland